Thomas Lewis (died 1764) was one of the founders of the Dowlais Ironworks, one of the largest ironworks in Wales.

Career
Born into a landed family from Llanishen, Cardiff, Thomas Lewis became an iron-master. He already owned the Pentyrch blast furnace and several small forges when he became a partner in Dowlais Ironworks in 1759. Lewis was the partner who arranged the mineral leases and construction of the new ironworks: the works were carried out by his business, Thomas Lewis & Co. He headed the business and his family interest was not bought out until 1848.

He was also a partner in the firm  of Coles, Lewis & Co which had interests at Melin-y-cwrt and Ynys-y-gerwn.

Lewis's family had lived at Llanishen for many generations but he was responsible for building the New House there. He was clearly a highly respected individual and served as High Sheriff of Glamorgan in 1757.

He died in 1764.

References

1764 deaths
Businesspeople from Cardiff
High Sheriffs of Glamorgan
Year of birth unknown